Anagennisi Karditsa Football Club is a Greek professional football club based in Karditsa, Greece, which competes in the Super League 2, the second tier of the Greek football league system. The club holds the record of the most participations in the Beta Ethniki, having played there 36 seasons in total.

History
One of the oldest clubs in Greek football, Anagennisi was formed in 1904 in the southwestern Thessalian city of Karditsa as the football team of the multisport club ASA, the Athletic Association Anagennisi. The name of the club comes from the Greek word for Renaissance. The statute of the club was signed personally by Crown Prince Constantine I.

From its inception in 1904, the football team of ASA was not officially recognized as a distinct entity within the organization. As more of the club's athletes began to show interest in the sport, the football team began to train, and play locally organized games, in the area of central Karditsa (which later became the Pavsilipo Park). With the sport's expanding popularity in Greece in the following decades, in 1924 the football team was finally given its own department within ASA. Playing in the independent, regional Thessalian League from 1929 to 1962, it joined the newly established Greek second division in time for Season 1962-63. When the Greek football league became professional in 1979, the football department of ASA was reformed as a Football Public Limited Company, or PAE (Greek: ΠΑΕ - Ποδοσφαιρική Ανώνυμη Εταιρία / Podosferiki Anonymi Eteria) and continued to compete as PAE Anagennisi Karditsas (FC Anagennisi Karditsa).

One of the highlights in Anagennisi Karditsa's history is  the victory over Olympiacos for the Greek Cup in 1993-94 as well as the win against Paniliakos for the Greek semi-professional Cup final in 1981. In 2008 Anagennisi Karditsa reach the Gamma Ethniki play-off and beat Ilioupoli 2-0 in Athens to win promotion to Beta Ethniki.

Anagennisi Karditsa is a well-supported club by regional football standards, and their passion is very well known. They hold the record for the most fans to ever attend an away game for Gamma Ethniki in 2008, with 2.000 supporters in the play-off match against Ilioupoli. In 2008-09 season Anagennisi Karditsa had the fourth best average in attendance despite having only avoided relegation in the last fixture against Veria.

Supporters and rivalries

Anagennisi Karditsa's main rivals are Trikala, from the neighbouring city of Trikala, and Ionikos. For many years, Anagennisi also maintained a bitter local rivalry with AOK. The fans have friendly relations with fans of Doxa Drama and Panetolikos.

Stadium

Since 1949, Anagennisi Karditsa plays its home games at the Municipal Stadium of Karditsa (Δημοτικό Στάδιο Καρδίτσας), located in the eastern part of Karditsa.
In January 2010 the stadium capacity was extended to 9,500 seats. Club training facilities, and football academy, are located in the nearby southern borough of Stavro.

Honours

Leagues 
Third Division
Winners (3): 1969, 1992–93, 1996–97
Runners-up (3): 1980–81, 2007–08, 2012–13
Fourth Division
Winners (3): 1991–92, 2011–12, 2020–21
Runners-up (2): 2002–03, 2003–04
 Greek Football Amateur Cup
 Winner (1): 1980–81
Thessaly FCA Championship
Winners (2): 1961–62, 1962–63

Cups 
Karditsa FCA Cup
Winners (4): 1980–81, 2001–02, 2003–04, 2011–12
Karditsa FCA Super Cup
Winners (1): 2011–12

Players

Current squad

Notable players 

  Pavlos Dermitzakis
  Vaios Karagiannis
  Sakis Tsiolis
  Georgios Vakouftsis 
 Sokratis Boudouris

Notable coaches 
 Andreas Stamatiadis (1973–74)
 Georgios Paraschos (1994–95)
 Vaios Karagiannis (2006–08, 2010–11, 2013)
 Giannis Mangos (2016–17)

External links
Official website
Gate 3 - Karditsa Fans (Official)
ASA Club Anthem
Ethniko Stadion Karditsas at Stadia.gr
anagenisi-karditsas.gr

 
Association football clubs established in 1904
Football clubs in Thessaly
1904 establishments in Greece
Super League Greece 2 clubs